

Old time Persian calligraphers
Ahmad Shamlou
Ahmad al-Suhrawardi
Alaeddin Tabrizi
Baysunghur Mirza
Ibn Muqla
Jafar Tabrizi (Baysonqori)
Marjan Kateb Islami
Mir Ali Tabrizi
Mir Emad Hassani
Mirza Qolam-Reza (Khosh-nevis Bashi)
Sultan Ali Mashhadi
Yaqut al-Musta'simi
Zeinolabedin Mahallati

Contemporary Iranian calligraphers
Ali Adjalli (b. 1939)  (alternative: Ghorbanali Ajali)
Golnaz Fathi
Qorban Ali Ajali Vaseq